The fourth and final season of the medical drama series The Night Shift began on June 22, 2017 on NBC in the United States with a timeslot change from Wednesday at 10:00 PM to Thursday at 10:00 PM. It is produced by Sachs/Judah Productions, and Sony Pictures Television with series creators Gabe Sachs and Jeff Judah serving as executive producers. The season concluded on August 31, 2017 and contained 10 episodes.

The series follows the overnight shift at San Antonio Medical Center, where after briefly quitting, the staff adjusts without former administrator and close friend, Dr. Topher Zia. Head of the night shift, Dr. Jordan Alexander (Jill Flint), works out a deal with new hospital owner, renowned neurosurgeon Dr. Julian Cummings, to rehire most of the staff. Meanwhile, Dr. Drew Alister (Brendan Fehr), struggles to find a balance between work and his new role as a father, while Dr. TC Callahan (Eoin Macken) spends time overseas at the Turkey-Syria border dealing with the humanitarian crisis. Also, Dr. Shannon Rivera (Tanaya Beatty) and Dr. Paul Cummings (Robert Bailey Jr.) deal with their feelings for each other.

Cast

Main cast
 Eoin Macken as Dr. TC Callahan
 Jill Flint as Dr. Jordan Alexander
 Brendan Fehr as Dr. Drew Alister
 Robert Bailey Jr. as Dr. Paul Cummings
 JR Lemon as ER Nurse Kenny Fournette
 Scott Wolf as Dr. Scott Clemmens
 Tanaya Beatty as Dr. Shannon Rivera

Recurring cast
 James McDaniel as Dr. Julian Cummings
 Mark Consuelos as Dr. Cain Diaz 
 Mac Brandt as Mac Reily
 Luke MacFarlane as Rick Lincoln
 Rana Roy as Dr. Amira 
 Erica Tazel as Dr. Bella Cummings

Guest star
 Jennifer Beals as Dr. Syd Jennings
 Sarah Jane Morris as Annie Callahan
 Wilmer Calderon as Boon
 Rob Estes as Colonel Parnell
 Kelli Berglund as Sofia

Episodes

Production
Production and filming  for the fourth season began in April 2017.

Ken Leung's departure
On November 22, 2016, Ken Leung (who played Dr. Topher Zia) announced that he would not be returning the series after three seasons citing not to renew his contract and to pursue other career opportunities.

Ratings

References

2017 American television seasons